Ângela Regina Vieira (born March 3, 1952) is a Brazilian stage and TV actress. She was also previously a ballet dancer.

Theatre
 1979 - Chapeuzinho quase Vermelho -
 1980 - A História é uma História
 1981 - A História é uma História -  Municipal de Niterói theatre
 1982 - A Nova Era (musical) -  Papagaio Café Cabaré theatre
 1982 - O Parto da Búfala - Gláucio Gil theatre
 1984 - Encouraçado Botequim (musical)
 1985 - Um Beijo, um Abraço e um Aperto de Mão - Villa Lobos theatre
 1986 - O Peru - Ginástico theatre
 1987 - Camas Redondas, Casais Quadrados - texto: J. Chapman, direção: José Renato, teatros Ginástico e da Praia
 1989 - Tem um Psicanalista na nossa Cama
 1990 - Somente entre nós - Cassino Estoril theatre in Lisboa
 1991 - Ato Cultural - Cândido Mendes theatre
 1992 - Se Eu Fosse Você
 1993 - Se Eu Fosse Você
 1994 - Meus Prezados Canalhas
 1997/98 - Salve Amizade - texto e direção: Flávio Marinho,  tournée pelo Brasil
 2004 - A Presença de Guedes

Music
 1998 - João de todos os Sambas
 2002 - Divina Saudade
 2002 - Mania de Vocês

TV filmography
 2014 - Em Família - Branca
 2013 - Flor do Caribe - Lindaura
 2011 - Fina Estampa - Mirna Bello/Gisela
 2011 - Insensato Coração - Gisela
 2010 - Na Forma da Lei - Eunice
 2009 - Cinquentinha - Leila Fratelli
 2008 - A Favorita - Arlete
 2007 - Paraíso Tropical - Cleonice
 2006 - Cobras & Lagartos - Celina
 2005 - Carga Pesada (série)
 2004 - Senhora do Destino - Gisela
 2003 - Kubanacan - Perla Perón
 2002 - Coração de Estudante - Esmeralda	
 2001 - Sai de Baixo (programa de humor)
 2001 - Brava Gente (série)
 2001 - Os Normais	(série)
 2000 - Aquarela do Brasil - Velma (minissérie)
 1999 - Terra Nostra - Janete
 1998 - Meu Bem Querer - Ava Gardner Maria Ferreira de Souza
 1997 - Por Amor - Virgínia
 1996 - Anjo de Mim - Zelinda
 1996 - O Fim do Mundo - Margarida Socó	
 1995 - A Idade da Loba - Irene (Rede Bandeirantes)	
 1991 - O fantasma da ópera - Anabela Vasconcelos (minissérie - Rede Manchete)			
 1990 - Araponga - Jurema	
 1988 - Olho por Olho - Elisa (Rede Manchete)
 1987 - Corpo Santo - Mara (Rede Manchete)
 1981 - Viva o Gordo (elenco fixo) - programa de humor
 1986 - Qualificação Profissional (TV Educativa)
 1986 - Armação Ilimitada: episódio – Os Olhos de Zelda Scott
 1983 - Os Trapalhões (programa de humor)
 1983 - Quarta Nobre: episódio – Mandrake - Louise
 1982 - Parabéns pra Você - Marlene (minissérie)
 1982 - Mário Fofoca - Marjô (episódio – Espiões de Biquini)
 1979 - Chico Anysio Show (programa de humor)
 1978 - Planeta dos Homens (elenco fixo) - programa de humor
 1979 - Chico Anysio Show (programa de humor)
 1979 - TV Educativa (aulas de dança moderna)

Prêmios

Choreography

 1985 - Astrofolias - texto: Ana Luiza Jobim, direção musical: Antônio Adolfo, direção: Lauro Góes, Teatro Villa Lobos e Teatro do Planetário da Gávea
 1985 - Zabadan - direção musical: Carlão, direção: Sérgio Carvalhal - Teatro América
 1988/93 - São Pedro - texto: Benjamim Santos, direção: Ginaldo de Souza - Urca, Posto Seis e Colônia do Cajú
 1989 - Cem Anos da República - texto: Benjamim Santos, direção musical: Roberto Nascimento, direção: Ginaldo de Souza - Arcos da Lapa

External links
 Ângela Vieira at the IMDb

Brazilian television actresses
Brazilian telenovela actresses
Brazilian stage actresses
Brazilian ballerinas
1952 births
Living people